Boris Schnuchel (born 15 March 1975) is a Danish handballer, currently playing for Danish Handball League side KIF Kolding, with whom he has played since 1997 and won 5 Danish Championships.

Schnuchel has played 31 matches with the Danish national handball team.

External links
 player info

1975 births
Living people
Danish male handball players
KIF Kolding players